Ellsworth Township is a township in Ellsworth County, Kansas, USA.  As of the 2000 census, its population was 797.

Geography
According to the USGS, it contains one cemetery, Memorial.

The streams of East Oak Creek, East Spring Creek, Oak Creek, Oxide Creek, Spring Creek and West Oak Creek run through this township.

Transportation
Ellsworth Township contains one airport or landing strip, Ellsworth Municipal Airport.

References
 USGS Geographic Names Information System (GNIS)

External links
 US-Counties.com
 City-Data.com

Townships in Ellsworth County, Kansas
Townships in Kansas